Carnation mottle virus (CarMV) is a plant pathogenic virus of the family Tombusviridae.

External links
 ICTVdB - The Universal Virus Database: Carnation mottle virus
 Family Groups - The Baltimore Method

Viral plant pathogens and diseases
Tombusviridae